Senator Conlan may refer to:

John Bertrand Conlan (1930–2021), Arizona State Senate
Martin E. Conlan (1849–1923), South Dakota State Senate